Aconchi Municipality is a municipality in Sonora in north-western Mexico.

The seat is Aconchi.

Neighboring municipalities are Huépac, Cumpas, Ures, Baviácora,  Rayón, Banámichi  and San Felipe de Jesús.

Localities 
The municipality currently is divided into 9 inhabited localities:

References

Municipalities of Sonora